Prosopis is a genus of flowering plants in the family Fabaceae. It contains around 45 species of spiny trees and shrubs found in subtropical and tropical regions of the Americas, Africa, Western Asia, and South Asia. They often thrive in arid soil and are resistant to drought, on occasion developing extremely deep root systems. Their wood is usually hard, dense and durable. Their fruits are pods and may contain large amounts of sugar. The generic name means "burdock" in late Latin and originated in the Greek language.

Selected species
Mesquites (southern United States, Mexico)
 Prosopis glandulosa Torr. – honey mesquite; Haas (Cmiique Iitom)
 Prosopis laevigata (Humb. & Bonpl. ex Willd.) M.C.Johnst. – smooth mesquite
 Prosopis pubescens Benth. – screwbean mesquite
 Prosopis reptans Benth. – tornillo
 Prosopis velutina Wooton – velvet mesquite
"Algarrobos", bayahondas etc. (Neotropics, particularly the Gran Chaco)
 Prosopis abbreviata Benth. – algarrobillo espinoso
 Prosopis affinis Spreng. – nandubay, algarrobillo, espinillo, Ibopé-morotí
 Prosopis alba Griseb. – algarrobo blanco; ibopé or igopé (Guaraní)
 Prosopis caldenia Burkart – caldén
 Prosopis chilensis (Molina) Stuntz – algarrobo Chileno, algarrobo blanco
 Prosopis fiebrigii Harms
 Prosopis flexuosa DC. – alpataco, algarrobo negro
 Prosopis hassleri Harms
 Prosopis juliflora (Sw.) DC. – bayahonda blanca, bayarone Français; kabuli kikar, vilayati babul, vilayati khejra or vilayati kikar (Hindi); trupillo or turpío (Wayuunaiki)
 Prosopis kuntzei Harms ex Kuntze – itín, barba de tigre, carandá, palo mataco
 Prosopis nigra (Griseb.) Hieron. – algarrobo negro, algarrobo amarillo, algarrobo dulce, algarrobo morado
 Prosopis pallida (Humb. & Bonpl. ex Willd.) Kunth – American carob, huarango, kiawe (Hawaiian)
 Prosopis rojasiana Burkart
 Prosopis ruscifolia Griseb. – vinal
 Prosopis strombulifera (Lam.) Benth. – creeping mesquite, Argentine screwbean
 Prosopis tamarugo Phil. – tamarugo
African species
 Prosopis africana (Guill. & Perr.) Taub. – gele (Malinke, traditional djembe wood)
Asian species (India, mainly Rajasthan, Sri Lanka to the Arabian Peninsula)
 Prosopis cineraria ** Prosopis spicigera (L.) Druce – jand; ghaf (Arabic); sami or sumri (Gujarati); khejri, sangri (Rajasthani); kandi (Sindhi)
 Prosopis farcta (Sol. ex Russell) J.F.Macbr.
 Prosopis koelziana Burkart (Iran)

Formerly placed hereAcacia atramentaria Benth. (as P. astringens Gillies ex Hook. & Arn.)Elephantorrhiza elephantina (Burch.) Skeels (as P. elephantina (Burch.) E.Mey. or P. elephantorrhiza Spreng.)Prosopidastrum globosum (Gillies ex Hook. & Arn.) Burkart (as P. globosa Gillies ex Hook. & Arn.)

 Taxonomic reclassification 

Genomic research published in 2022 concludes that species grouped under the genus Prosopis actually represent multiple genera including Anonychium, Neltuma, Prosopis, and Strombocarpa.

 Phytochemistry Prosopis species have been found to contain 5-hydroxytryptamine, apigenin, isorhamnetin-3-diglucoside, l-arabinose, quercetin, tannin, and tryptamine.

The tannins present in Prosopis species are of the pyrogallotannin and pyrocatecollic types. The tannins are mainly found in the bark and wood while their concentration in the pods is low.

Some species, such as P. africana or P. velutina, produce a gum (mesquite gum).

As an introduced and invasive species
The species Prosopis pallida was introduced to Hawaii in 1828 and now dominates many of the drier coastal parts of the islands, where it is called the kiawe tree and is a prime source of monofloral honey production.

In Australia, invasive Prosopis species are causing severe economic and environmental damage. With their thorns and many low branches, Prosopis shrubs form impenetrable thickets which prevent cattle from accessing watering holes, etc. They also take over pastoral grasslands and suck up scarce water. Prosopis species cause land erosion due to loss of grassland that are habitats for native plants and animals. Prosopis thickets also provide shelter for feral animals such as pigs and cats.

For more information on invasiveness of mesquite species, see Prosopis glandulosa and Prosopis juliflora.

Eradication
Some herbicides are not effective or only partially effective against mesquite. Spray techniques for removal, while effective against short-term regrowth, are expensive, costing more than $70/acre ($170/hectare) in the USA. Removing large trees requires tracked equipment;  costs can approach $2,000 per acre. In Australia, several techniques are used to remove Prosopis''.

See also
 Invasive species in Australia

References

Notes

General references
Paciecznik, N. M., Harris P. J. C., & S. J. Smith. 2003. Identifying Tropical Prosopis Species: A Field Guide. HDRA, Coventry, UK. .
Handbook on taxonomy of Prosopis in Mexico, Peru and Chile (FAO Document Repository)
Plant Walk I: Old Main (website of the Vascular Plant Herbarium of the University of Arizona in Tucson)
Plant Walk 1 UofA
Plant Walk 2 UofA

External links

U.S. Federal Noxious Weed List (USDA)
The Prosopis Website (Has a nice range map)

 
Forages
Medicinal plants
Taxa named by Carl Linnaeus
Fabaceae genera